TP is the fourth album by American R&B singer Teddy Pendergrass. It reached No. 14 on the US pop albums chart and No. 3 on the US R&B albums chart. It spawned the top ten singles, "Can't We Try", which was also featured in the soundtrack to the film Roadie, and "Love T.K.O.".  It's also his only album while at Philadelphia International Records without any input from label founders Kenneth Gamble and Leon Huff.

Track listing
"Is It Still Good to Ya?" (Nickolas Ashford, Valerie Simpson)
"Take Me in Your Arms Tonight" (duet with Stephanie Mills) (Dexter Wansel, Cynthia Biggs)
"I Just Called to Say" (Cecil Womack)
"Can't We Try" (Ken Hirsch, Ron Miller)
"Feel the Fire" (duet with Stephanie Mills) (Peabo Bryson)
"Girl You Know" (Nickolas Ashford, Valerie Simpson)
"Love T.K.O." (Womack, Eddie "Gip" Nobel)
"Let Me Love You" (Jerry Cohen, Gene McFadden, John Whitehead)

Charts

Singles

References

External links
 Teddy Pendergrass-TP at Discogs

Teddy Pendergrass albums
1980 albums
Albums produced by Ashford & Simpson
Albums recorded at Sigma Sound Studios
Philadelphia International Records albums